Martha Raddatz (born February 14, 1953) is an American reporter with ABC News. She is the network's Chief Global Affairs Correspondent reporting for ABC's World News Tonight with David Muir, Nightline, and other network broadcasts. In addition to her work for ABC News, Raddatz has written for The New Republic and is a frequent guest on PBS's Washington Week. Raddatz is the co-anchor and primary fill-in anchor on This Week with George Stephanopoulos.

Early life
Raddatz was born in Idaho Falls, Idaho. Her family later moved to Salt Lake City.  She attended the University of Utah but dropped out to work at a local station.

Career

Prior to 1993, Raddatz was the chief correspondent at the ABC News Boston affiliate WCVB-TV.  From 1993 to 1998, Raddatz covered the Pentagon for National Public Radio.

Raddatz began her tenure at ABC News in 1999 as the network's State Department correspondent and became ABC's senior national security correspondent in May 2003, reporting extensively from Iraq. On June 8, 2006, Raddatz received a tip that terrorist Abu Musab al-Zarqawi had been located and killed. This tip allowed Raddatz and ABC News to become the first news organization in the world to break the news shortly after 2:30 a.m. EST.

In a March 24, 2008, extended interview with Dick Cheney conducted in Ankara, Turkey, on the fifth anniversary of the 2003 invasion of Iraq, Raddatz posed a question about public opinion polls showing that Americans had lost confidence in the war, a question to which Cheney responded by saying "So?" Raddatz appeared taken aback by the response, and Cheney's  remark prompted widespread criticism, including a Washington Post op-ed by former Republican Congressman and Cheney friend  Mickey Edwards.

Raddatz is also the author of the New York Times bestseller The Long Road Home: A Story of War and Family, a book about the Siege of Sadr City, Iraq. A TV mini series based on the book aired on NatGeo in late 2017.

After the national security beat, Raddatz became the network's chief White House correspondent for the last term of the George W. Bush administration. On January 9, 2007, Raddatz's mobile phone went off during a White House press briefing with Tony Snow. Of particular humor was her musical ring tone, Chamillionaire's "Ridin'." The press corps and Tony Snow enjoyed a few moments of laughter.

Raddatz was appointed to her current position as ABC's Senior Foreign Affairs Correspondent in November 2008.

Raddatz served as the moderator of the Vice-Presidential debate on October 11, 2012, between Paul Ryan and Joe Biden at Centre College in Danville, Kentucky. Raddatz also served alongside Anderson Cooper as co-moderator for the second presidential debate in 2016, between Hillary Clinton and Donald Trump at Washington University in St. Louis. Anderson and Raddatz were reviewed and some commentators noted their "no-nonsense approach" and "aggressive style", though Raddatz was criticized for a challenge to one of Trump's statements, which some journalists felt "fell outside of her mandate as moderator".

The Guardian said in 2014 that Raddatz "is known for having well-cultivated sources inside the defense department."

Raddatz appeared as a reporter interviewing the President-elect of the United States in the 2017 episode "Imminent Risk" of the Showtime series Homeland.

Personal life 
Raddatz resides in Arlington, Virginia, with her third husband, journalist Tom Gjelten. She has two children from two previous marriages: a daughter, Greta Bradlee, and a son, Jake Genachowski.  Her first husband was Ben Bradlee Jr., a Pulitzer Prize-winning editor for The Boston Globe, biographer, and son of former Washington Post executive editor Benjamin C. Bradlee. Her second husband was Julius Genachowski, chairman of the U.S. Federal Communications Commission under the Obama administration. President Barack Obama attended their wedding in 1991, when he and Genachowski were students at Harvard Law School.

References

External links
Profile at ABC News
Martha Raddatz on NPR

C-SPAN Q&A interview with Raddatz, September 17, 2006
C-SPAN Q&A interview with Raddatz, January 9, 2011

Interview on The Long Road Home at the Pritzker Military Museum & Library

American television reporters and correspondents
American radio reporters and correspondents
American war correspondents
1953 births
Living people
ABC News personalities
Emmy Award winners
Peabody Award winners
Women war correspondents
Women military writers
American military writers
Television anchors from Boston
People from Arlington County, Virginia
People from Idaho Falls, Idaho
People from Salt Lake City
20th-century American women writers
21st-century American women writers
20th-century American journalists
21st-century American journalists
American women television journalists
American women radio journalists